Lindby is a village in the municipality Borgholm on the island Öland and the province Kalmar län in Sweden. The village has 60 inhabitants (2005).

Populated places in Borgholm Municipality